Bayastan (before 2004: Маданият Madaniyat) is a village in Jalal-Abad Region of Kyrgyzstan. It is part of the Ala-Buka District. Its population was 6,600 in 2021.

Population

References

Populated places in Jalal-Abad Region